Coleophora tiliaefoliella is a moth of the family Coleophoridae. It is found in North America, including Oklahoma, Pennsylvania and Ontario.

The larvae feed on the leaves of Tilia species. They create a pistol-shaped case.

References

tiliaefoliella
Moths of North America
Moths described in 1861